One Night Stand is a 2016 Indian Hindi erotic romantic drama film written by Bhavani Iyer and directed by Jasmine D'Souza. It features Tanuj Virwani and Sunny Leone in the lead roles. The film centers on a man who ends up becoming obsessed with a woman he has a one night stand with. Principal photography was wrapped up in 55 days and filming locations included Mumbai, Bangkok and Pune. The film was released on 6 May 2016. The film was also dubbed in Telugu and Tamil .

Plot 
The movie starts off with a flashback that's being narrated by Urvil (Tanuj Virwani). It is the flashback and a series of events from his past that has defined his present. The flashback starts off with a fashion show organised by his event management agency in Phuket, Thailand. And after completing the event successfully, Urvil and his colleagues go drinking to celebrate. It is here that his friends challenge him to speak to a rank stranger (Sunny Leone) for a few thousand rupees. An attempt to win the bet gets him introduced to the stranger who, in turn, introduces herself as Celina. What follows after that, is unlimited liquor drinking by the two of them, which ultimately lands them up in bed together. But, the very next day, when Urvil gets up, he finds out that Celina has already left the room, without leaving any details of her whereabouts. And when Urvil comes back to his home in Pune, he is welcomed by his beautiful and dutiful wife Simran (Nyra Banerjee). Things are absolutely smooth between the couple, until one day Urvil accidentally spots Celina in the same mall wherein he has gone for shopping with his wife Simran. That very sight of Celina freshens up his 'one night stand' with her, which, in turn, gets translated into his desperation to meet her again. Thereafter begins his unending quest to hunt down Celina from the length and the breadth of the world. Amidst all this, Urvil gets extremely busy with his company's big-budget event of a product launch.
    
It is here where he gets introduced to his rich client Adhiraj Kapoor (Khalid Siddiqui) and his family, which takes the daylights out of Urvil. The mysterious lady Celina is none other than Ambar, wife, of Adhiraj, who along with their young son Jahaan (Rehan Pathan) and Adhiraj's father Raghav (Kanwaljeet Singh) stay in their posh villa in Koregaon Park, Pune. Urvil loses interest in his job and wife and stalks Celina/ Ambar. His colleague David (Ninad Kamat) advises him to forget Celina in order to save his marriage but he ignores his advice. Urvil tails Ambar continuously. Being fed up, she asks him to leave her alone and forget whatever happened between them as 'one night stand' but he refuses to do so and Urvil haunts her so much that he reaches their home and embarrasses Ambar. He rapes Simran, uttering Celina's name. She picks up a fight with him and on the pretext of dropping him to his office, she races their car in the busy street asking Urvil to confess as to who is Celina and about their affair. He is terrified due to the rashly driven speeding car and admits to Simran about the illegitimate affair with Celina. She drops him on the road-side and tells him that it's all over between them. He returns home and begs her to pardon him for his folly but Simran is firm in refusing. Ultimately, Ambar calls Urvil to a spot on the highway to inform him that he should forget whatever happened between them and leave her alone. Urvil blames her for his marriage turmoil but she retorts that he was himself responsible. When Urvil threatens her that he would reveal the secret to Adhiraj, she informs him that she would do so herself irrespective of the consequence. She leaves him alone brooding about his future. The film ends with Urvil quitting his job and moving ahead in life in search of a new beginning.

Cast 
Sunny Leone as Celina/Ambar Kapoor, wife of Adhiraj
Tanuj Virwani as Urvil Shekhar Raisingh
Nyra Banerjee as Simran Raisingh, Urvil's wife
Khalid Siddiqui as Adhiraj Kapoor
Kanwaljit Singh as Raghav Kapoor, Adhiraj's father
Ninad Kamat as David
Narendra Jetley as Azad Awasthi
Shishir Sharma as Mr. Walia
Kushagra Singh as Samar
Kapil Punjabi as Dilip Shah
Aamir Ahmed as Siddharth Ahuja aka Sid
Farhana Fatema as Jyoti
Ashai Sachdeva as Rohit
Shatakshi Dubey as Tanya
Kiyomi Mehta as Deepa, wife of David
Rehan Pathan as Jahaan Kapoor, son of Adhiraj
Geeta Bisht as Diya
Raju as Shyam, help
Kartik Damani as customer
Elli Avram as Sana

Production
Rana Daggubati was replaced by Tanuj Virwani due to the former's lack of dates as he was committed for his Telugu film Baahubali. Sunny Leone started preparing for her role since December 2014. Filming was wrapped up in 55 days.

Soundtrack
The music for the film was composed by Jeet Gannguli, Meet Bros, Tony Kakkar and Vivek Kar, while the background score was composed by Sandeep Shirodkar. The lyrics were penned by Kumaar, Manoj Muntashir and Shabbir Ahmed. The first song "Do Peg Maar" was released on 30 March 2016. The second song "Ijazat" released on 4 April 2016. The soundtrack was released on 6 April 2016 by T-Series.

Box office

India
The film collected  60 lacs on its opening day then it collected  61 lacs and  75 lacs on its second and third day respectively which bring film to weekend collection of  19.6 million. From fourth to seventh day film collected  1 crore, then its last six days collection of  6 lacs brings film to a total collection of  30.2 million in India.

References

External links

2016 films
2010s Hindi-language films
2010s erotic thriller films
Indian erotic thriller films
Indian romantic thriller films
Films about adultery in India
Indian erotic romance films
2010s erotic drama films
Indian erotic drama films
2010s romantic thriller films
2016 drama films